Charles Sprague Pearce (13 October 1851 – 18 May 1914) was an American artist.

Biography

Pearce was born in Boston, Massachusetts. In 1873 he became a pupil of Léon Bonnat in Paris, and after 1885 he lived in Paris and at Auvers-sur-Oise. He painted Egyptian and Algerian scenes, French peasants, and portraits, and also decorative work, notably for the Thomas Jefferson Building at the Library of Congress at Washington.  He received medals at the Paris Salon and elsewhere, and was made Chevalier of the French Legion of Honor, decorated with the Order of Leopold, Belgium, the Order of the Red Eagle, Prussia, and the Order of the Dannebrog, Denmark.

Works
Among his best-known paintings are The Decapitation of St John the Baptist (1881); Prayer (1884), The Return of the Flock, and Meditation.  Pearce was also among those who knew and painted the Capri muse Rosina Ferrara.

Images

References

1851 births
1914 deaths
19th-century American painters
19th-century American male artists
20th-century American painters
American muralists
American male painters
Artists from Boston
Orientalist painters

Chevaliers of the Légion d'honneur
Order of the Dannebrog
20th-century American male artists